The following is a timeline of the history of the city of Aarhus, Central Denmark Region, Denmark.

Viking Age
 750-800 - Aarhus is founded by the northern shore of the Aarhus River.
 c. 900 - The first church, the Holy Trinity Church, is built during the reign of Frode, King of Jutland. 
 c. 900 - Gorm the Old fortifies Aarhus with ramparts.
 10th century - Harald Bluetooth strengthens and expands the ramparts.
 948 - First mention of Aarhus as the bishop of Aarhus Reginbrand attends the Synod of Ingelheim.
 988 - Diocese of Aarhus is dissolved.
 1035–42 - Harthacnut coins money stamped with the original name of Aarhus: "AROS".
 1043 
 Svend Estridsen gains support from Aros in war against Magnus the Good and a battle between the two are fought in the Bay of Aarhus.
 Magnus the Good becomes ruler of Aarhus for a period and coins money inscribed "Magnus Konge, Lif-sig i Aros" in latin.
 1050 - Harald Hardrada attacks Aarhus and burns the settlement including the Holy Trinity Church.
 1060 
 Diocese of Aarhus is reestablished as Svend Estridsen divides the country into 8 bishoprics.
 Crypt church is constructed on the site of the former Holy Trinity Church and present day Church of Our Lady.

Middle Ages
 1080 - The crypt church is expanded and dedicated to Saint Nicholas.
 12th century
 The bishopric begins collecting tithe.
 The defensive ramparts are strengthened and a cobbled ring road built along it.
 1134 - The bishop of Aarhus Ulkil is killed at the Battle of Fotevik in support of King Niels.
 1180
 Saint Nicholas Church mentioned as the first cathedral of Aarhus.
 Niels of Aarhus dies and is buried in Aarhus.
 1191 - Peder Vognsen is appointed bishop by King Canute VI.
 c. 1192 - Construction begins on Aarhus Cathedral on the burial site of Niels of Aarhus.
 1195 - Aarhus Cathedral School is mentioned for the first time. The school possibly predates the Aarhus Cathedral.
 13th century - Valdemar II builds a grain mill at Aarhus River and hand grinders are made illegal.
 c. 1250 - Dominican friars are given Saint Nicholas Church which they tear down and begins construction on Church of Our Lady. 
 1298 - King Eric VI grants the Diocese of Aarhus rent from the peasantry enlisted in leidang.
 1441 - Christopher of Bavaria ratifies existing market town privileges.
 1477 - 
Christian I grants citizens of Aarhus rights to fisheries in Lillebælt, Kalø Vig and  Jutland.
 The defensive ramparts ringing the town since the Viking age are removed.
 1483 - King Hans ratifies that citizens of Aarhus are free of duties and may trade in all markets in Jutland.
 1496 - King Hans ratifies that citizens of Aarhus may use all fisheries in Jutland.

Renaissance 16th - 18th century 
 1505 - King Hans establishes a four-mile exclusion zone around Aarhus within which only citizens may trade with farmers.
 1542 - Large fires break out destroying parts of present Indre By.
 1546 - Parts of the city burns down as fires breaks out.
 1556 - Large fires breaks out.
 1627-1629 - Aarhus is occupied by Albrecht von Wallenstein's troops on behest of Ferdinand II during the Thirty Years' War.
 1637 - Thors Mølle is constructed as a powder mill.
 1644-1645 - Occupation by Swedish troops during the Torstenson War
 1657 - Wooden city walls erected as octroi is introduced.
 1657-1659 - Aarhus is occupied during the Dano-Swedish wars of 1657–58 and 1658–60.
 1659 
 Aarhus is bombarded by 13 Swedish warships during the Dano-Swedish War of 1658–60.
 Plague breaks out in the city. Nationwide a third of the population is killed.
 1662 - The medieval fiefs reformed into counties and Aarhus County is established.
 1672 - 3,474 inhabitants.
 1740 - New citizens council established, composed of the wealthiest citizens.
 1794 - Århus Stiftstidende is published for the first time.

19th century 
 1801 - 3,837 inhabitants.
 1830 
 Regular steamship links with Copenhagen begins.
 Vennelystparken opens for the first time.
 1838 - Electoral rules changed to allow voting for the city council. 
 1840 - 7,087 inhabitants.
 Harbor moved from the Aarhus river to the coast. 
 1849 
 Occupied by Prussian troops during the First Schleswig War. 
 The skirmish known as Rytterfægtningen is fought in the area of present-day Trøjborg.
 Denmark gets constitution and new electoral laws. The greater half of citizens representatives to be elected by all citizens while the other half is elected by the highest taxed citizens.
 1850 - The psychiatric hospital of Jydske Asyl opens.
 1851 - 11,009 inhabitants.
Octroi abolished and the city walls removed.
 1854 - Frichs company is established.
 1856 - The Ceres Brewery is established.
 1862 - Jutland's first railway established between Aarhus and Randers.
 1864 - Aarhus is occupied by Prussian troops during the Second Schleswig War.  
 1869 - Citizen Representation reformed to a city council with 19 members elected for 6 years. 10 members elected by all citizens, 9 by the highest taxed.
 1871
Aarhus Oliefabrik A/S is established.
Jyllands-Posten publishes its first paper.
 1873 - Cholera kills 213.
 1874 - Frederiksbjerg annexed.
 1875 - Aarhus Botanical Gardens is constructed.
 1876 - The Grenaa Line opens; connecting Aarhus to Grenå by rail.
 1880 - 24,831 inhabitants.
 1882 - Aarhus County Hospital founded.
 1883
 Aarhus Butterine Company is established.
 First public transportation in the form of horse drawn carriages.      
 1884 - The rail line Odderbanen opens, connecting Aarhus to Odder.
 1893 - Aarhus Municipal Hospital is founded.
 1896 
 Korn- og Foderstof Kompagniet is established.
 Marselisborg estate purchased.
 Construction on Trøjborg begins.
 1900 - Aarhus Theatre is completed.

20th century 
 
 1901 - 51,814 inhabitants.
 1902 
 The State Library is finished. The historicist building was later repurposed as Erhvervsarkivet (The Corporate Archives) in 1948.   
 Marselisborg Palace is established.
 1904 - Tivoli Friheden starts as an amusement park.
 1906 - Frederik Ferdinand Salling opens the store that will eventually grow to become the Salling department store.   
 1909 
 Aarhus hosts the National Exhibition of 1909.    
 Electoral periods for the city council changed to 4 years, privileged electoral system abolished and women given voting rights.
 1911 - 64,607 inhabitants.
 1912 - Den Gamle By is established.
 1913 - Marselisborg Hospital opens.
 1919 - First publicly elected mayor.
 1921 - 86,197 inhabitants.
 1925 - Mindeparken is established.
 1928 
 Aarhus University is opened. 
 Aarhus Sporveje is established.
 1929 - The Central Station is completed.
 1930 - 101,423 inhabitants.
 1931 - Spanien Public Baths opens.
 1932 
 Marselisborg Deer Park is established.
 University Park is established.
 1933 
 The first university buildings opens
 Den Permanente is established.
 1937 - The ring road of Ring 1 is finished.
 1940 - 126,459 inhabitants.

World War II
 10 April 1940 - Aarhus occupied by invading German troops.   
 1941
 The Aarhus City Hall by architect Arne Jacobsen is completed.
 The Royal Air Force bombs a viaduct in Viby.
 24 September 1942 - The Aarhus oil mill is bombed by the Royal Air Force.
 3 July 1943 - The resistance bombs and destroys the viaduct at Spanien.
 4 July 1944 - German barge loaded with ammunition explodes in the harbor killing 38. 
 22 August 1944 – Aarhus Sporveje tram depot on Dalgas Avenue is blown up in an act of schalburgtage.   
 10 October 1944 - German steamer Scharnhörn bombed by the resistance movement. 
 30 September 1944 – Aarhus-Hallen is bombed killing 5 people.
 9 October 1944 – The Peter group destroys the building of the newspaper Demokraten.
 31 October 1944 - The Gestapo headquarters in Aarhus University is bombed by the Royal Air Force.
 11 November 1944 – Five buildings on Ryesgade are destroyed by the Peter group.
 12 November 1944 – Buildings in Søndergade 10-14, 23- 27, 29 and 58-60 are bombed.
 2 December 1944 – Aarhus Håndværkerforening is bombed killing 1 person.
 21 January 1945 – Vennelyst Teateret (Vennelyst Theatre) in Vennelystparken is bombed.
 22 February 1945 – The Peter group bombs Guldsmedgade, Nørregade, Ryesgade and Aarhus Theatre killing 8 people.
 13 March 1945 – Risskovtoget (Risskov Train) is bombed killing two people.
 29 March 1945 - Editor of Århus Stiftstidende Børge Schmidt is shot and killed in a clearing murder.
 5 May 1945 - Fighting between resistance fighters and German forces refusing surrender claims 15 lives.    
 8 May 1945 - British troops enter and officially liberate Aarhus from German occupation.

Post-World War II 
 1945 - Aarhus Flydedok is established.
 1948 - Erhvervsarkivet (The Corporate Archives) opens in the building formerly housing the State Library.
 1950 - 153,546 inhabitants.
 City management of Aarhus is changed to a Magistrate.
 1960 - 177,234 inhabitants.
 First direct elections of county council.
 1963 - The landmark State and University Library tower and building in yellow brick at the university campus is finished.
 1965 - The first Aarhus Festuge festival is held.
 1968 - Construction of the Gellerup Plan, a large modernist suburban satellite city, begins.
 1970 - 199,427 inhabitants.
 Aarhus Municipality is merged with a number of surrounding municipalities during the 1970 Danish Municipal Reform
 1975 - The anti-nuclear Smiling Sun logo is designed by the local group of Organisationen til Oplysning om Atomkraft.
 1977 - The first Moesgård Vikingetræf event is held.
 1979 - Machine manufacturing company Frichs, a large local employer, is declared bankrupt. Production in Aarhus was finally halted, after more than 125 years, in the 1980s.
 1982 - Musikhuset (Aarhus Concert Hall) is finished
 1983 - Gaffa is published for the first time.
 1987 - The ring road of Ring 2 opens.
 1988
 University hospital Skejby Sygehus opens.
 The afforestation of the New Forests of Aarhus is initiated.
 1989 - The first Aarhus International Jazz Festival.
 1990 - 200,188 inhabitants.
 1991
 KaosPilots is founded by Uffe Elbæk.
 Marselisborg Yacht Harbour opens
 1994 - The first SpoT Festival is held.
 1995 - Scandinavian Center is finished
 2000 - 217,260 inhabitants.

21st century
 2002 
 Louise Gade becomes the first woman and non-Social Democratic mayor of Aarhus.
 The re-establishment of Årslev Engsø begins.
 2003 
 The dockyard of Aarhus Flydedok closes after 58 years, following a bankruptcy.
 Bruun's Galleri shopping mall opens.
 2004 - ARoS art museum opens
 2005 - The nature sites of Hasle Hills and Skjoldhøjkilen are inaugurated.
 2006 - 228,674 inhabitants.
 The lake of Egå Engsø is created.
 2007
 Construction begins on Aarhus Ø.
 Aarhus County is dissolved and Aarhus becomes part of Central Denmark Region.
 2008 - The Ceres Brewery closed production in Aarhus after 152 years.
 2009 
 Sculpture by the Sea is held for the first time. 
 The first Northside Festival is held.

2010's 
 2011
City council elects to change spelling from "Århus" to "Aarhus".
 Aarhus University Hospital is created.
 2012
 Aarhus Pride is held for the first time.
 Construction begins on CeresByen.
 2013 - 256,018 inhabitants.
 Construction begins on Aarhus Letbane (Aarhus light rail)
 2014
 The new Moesgård Museum (MOMU) opens.
 The New University Hospital (DNU) partly opens to become fully operational in 2020.
Aarhus City Tower, the second tallest building in the city at 94 metres, opens.
 2015 
 Dokk1 opens.
 Redevelopment of Frederiks Plads begins.
 2017
 Aarhus is European Capital of Culture
 The inner harbour front and two squares of Hack Kampmanns Plads and Havnepladsen are finished.
 Aarhus Letbane opens
 2018 -  273,077 inhabitants
 The harbour baths of Havnebadet opens
 The New University Hospital (DNU) is finished
 Aarhus County Hospital is closed after 136 years of service
 Risskov Psychiatric Hospital (Jydske Asyl) is closed after 168 year of service
 2019
 Aarhus Municipal Hospital is closed after 125 years of service

See also
 Mayors of Aarhus (since 1919)
 Timelines of other cities in Denmark: Copenhagen

References

Publications